Jaleela bint Sayed Jawad Hassan is the Minister of Health for the Kingdom of Bahrain since June 2022.

Prior to this role, she was the Chief Executive Officer of Primary Healthcare Centres. And for twelve years prior to the CEO's role, she was a Public Health Consultant which included a time as the Acting Head of Immunization Group in Disease Control Section of the Ministry of Health, Bahrain.

Education

After her Bachelor's Degree in Medicine & Surgery (M.B.B.S) in 2000, from King Faisal University in Saudi Arabia, she earned her Licensure from the Ministry of Health, after Bahrain Medical Licensure Examination.

References

Living people
Health Ministers of Bahrain
Women government ministers of Bahrain